The 1944 United States Senate election in California was held on November 7, 1944. 

Incumbent Democratic Senator Sheridan Downey was re-elected to a second term in office over Republican Lieutenant Governor Frederick F. Houser.

Democratic primary

Candidates
 Justus F. Craemer
 Irene Dockweiler
 Sheridan Downey, incumbent Senator since 1939
 John J. Taheney
 Jack B. Tenney, singer and anti-communist State Senator from Banning

Results

Republican primary

Candidates
 Philip Bancroft, 1938 Republican nominee for Senate
 William G. Bonelli, former member of the California Board of Equalization, former Los Angeles City Councilman, and State Representative
 Roland C. Casad, perennial candidate
 Justus F. Craemer
 John S. Crowder
 Frederick F. Houser, Lieutenant Governor of California
 Charles G. Johnson, California State Treasurer
 Alonzo J. Riggs
 John J. Taheney
 Jack B. Tenney, singer and anti-communist State Senator from Banning

Results

Prohibition primary

Candidates
 Sheridan Downey, incumbent Senator since 1939 (cross-filing)
 Frederick F. Houser, Lieutenant Governor of California (cross-filing)

Results

General election

Results

See also 
 1944 United States Senate elections

References

Notes 

1944
California
United States Senate